Eucalyptus koolpinensis, commonly known as Koolpin box, is a species of straggly tree that is endemic to the Northern Territory. It has rough, fibrous bark on the trunk and branches, more or less round adult leaves, flower buds in groups of seven, creamy white flowers and cup-shaped fruit.

Description
The bark is grey to grey-white in colour and rough to the ends of branches. It is tightly held box-type bark, becoming tessellated on the trunk. The flower buds are arranged on the ends of branchlets on a branching peduncle each branch with seven buds. Flowering occurs between April and June and the flowers are creamy white.

Taxonomy and naming
Eucalyptus koolpinensis was first formally described by the botanists Ian Brooker and Clyde Dunlop in 1978 in the journal Australian Forest Research. The specific epithet is a reference to Koolpin Creek in the Northern Territory where the type specimen was taken.

Distribution and habitat
Koolpin box grows near the edge of broken sandstone outcrops in shallow soil and on the edge of nearby plains, often in almost pure stands. It is only known from two locations between the South Alligator River and Koolpin Gorge.

See also

List of Eucalyptus species

References

Trees of Australia
koolpinensis
Myrtales of Australia
Flora of the Northern Territory
Plants described in 1978
Taxa named by Ian Brooker